Worknesh Musele Handeno (born 10 June 2001) is an Ethiopian athlete who has won Ethiopian national championship titles over 400 metres and 800 metres.

Career
Musele ran the 11th fastest time in the world in 2021 in the women’s 800m when she completed the Ethiopian Olympic Trial. She had previously competed at the 2019 African Games in Kabat in the 400m and the 4x400m relay.

She ran  a personal best 1:58:71 in the 800m at the Ethiopian Olympic trial to finish third behind Werkwuha Getachew and Habitam Alemu in June 2021 to secure her place at the delayed 2020 Tokyo Olympics. Her previous personal best had been 2:02:20. She was named in the Ethiopian squad for the games, however she did not compete.  On 30 June, 2021 she won the 800m at the Irena Szewińska Memorial meeting in Bydgoszcz on the 2021 World Athletics Continental Tour, beating compatriot Diribe Welteji by .07 seconds.

In March 2022 Mesele won her second national title winning the 800m in Hawassa. She finished fourth in the 2022 African Championships in Athletics – Women's 800 metres race.

References

External links
 
 Worknesh Mesele Handeno at myKhel.com
 Worknesh Mesele Handeno at The-Sports.org

2001 births
Living people
Ethiopian female sprinters
Ethiopian female middle-distance runners
Athletes (track and field) at the 2019 African Games
21st-century Ethiopian women